Abellio Rail may refer to:

Abellio Deutschland
Abellio Greater Anglia
Abellio ScotRail